Hoshaiah is a biblical name.  It may refer to:

 Hoshaiah Rabbah (c.200), an amora (Jewish scholar) of the first generation
 Hoshaiah II (died c.350), an amora of the third and fourth generations

See also
 Hoshaya, a community settlement in northern Israel